Criss Angel's Magic With the Stars is an American television magic show that premiered on October 22, 2022 on The CW.

Format

Production
On May 19, 2022, it was announced that The CW had ordered the series. On December 9, 2021, Eddie Griffin was announced as host of the show, with Criss Angel, Loni Love and Lance Burton serving as judges.

The series premiered on October 22, 2022.

Episodes

Reception

References

External links

2020s American reality television series
2022 American television series debuts
American television magic shows
The CW original programming
English-language television shows